Seré Una Niña Buena is the first studio album by the Mexican singer Mariana Seoane. It was released in 2004, and it was nominated for Best Grupero Album at the Latin Grammy Awards of 2004. In 2003, Seoane was offered her second starring role on a telenovela, when she participated as Rebeca Linares in Venevision's production, Rebeca. Seoane then recorded the album that became a mild success in Seoane's career. It peaked at number 42 in the Billboard Top Latin Album chart. The lead single "Me Equivoqué" peaked at number 18 in the Billboard Hot Latin Tracks Chart, and "Que no me faltes tú", the second single, was more successful, peaking at number 6 in the Hot Latin Tracks chart.

Track listing
 Que No Me Faltes Tú
 Me Equivoqué	
 Que Mal Elegiste	
 Como Un Fantasma
 Déjalo	
 Dime Corazón	
 Mi Gran Noche	
 Pa' Que Sientas Lo Que Siento	
 Propiedad Privada
 Yo Necesito Un Par	
 Me Equivoqué (Pop)	
 Me Equivoqué (Norteña)	
 Me Equivoqué (Salsa)

Sales and certifications

References

billboard hot latin tracks. billboard.com

2004 debut albums
Mariana Seoane albums